Monica Rokhman (born May 27, 1997) is an American group rhythmic gymnast.

Rokhman was raised in San Diego, California, and represents the United States at international competitions. She competed at the 2013, 2014 and 2015 World Rhythmic Gymnastics Championships. At the 2015 World Championships, the American team finished in 13th place with 32.299 points, ahead of Brazil and the highest among all non-Asian and non-European countries, and qualified to the 2016 Summer Olympics.

She was born in Northbrook, Illinois, to Dmitry and Sveltana Rokhman, Russian Jews who immigrated to the United States. She performs together with Jennifer Rokhman, her twin sister. In 2010, the two sisters moved back to Illinois to train for the national rhythmic gymnastics team. She was a member of the American team at the 2016 Olympics in Rio de Janeiro.

References

1997 births
Living people
American rhythmic gymnasts
Jewish American sportspeople
Jewish gymnasts
Gymnasts at the 2015 Pan American Games
Pan American Games gold medalists for the United States
Pan American Games silver medalists for the United States
Twin sportspeople
Russian Jews
People from Northbrook, Illinois
Pan American Games medalists in gymnastics
Medalists at the 2015 Pan American Games
21st-century American Jews
21st-century American women